Alan White may refer to:

Music 
Alan White (DJ) (born 1941), American disc jockey
Alan White (Oasis drummer) (born 1972), English drummer in rock group Oasis
Alan White (Yes drummer) (1949–2022), English drummer in rock group Yes

Sports 
Alan White (Australian footballer) (1933–2018), Australian rules footballer
Alan White (English footballer) (born 1976), English footballer

Other 
Alan White (American philosopher) (born 1951), American philosopher
Alan White (actor) (1924–2013), Australian actor
Alan White (economist), University of Toronto finance professor
Alan White (novelist) (1924–2003), English novelist, author of The Long Day's Dying
Alan White (RAF officer) (born 1932), British air marshal
Alan David White (1923–2020), American physicist
Alan R. White (1922–1992), Irish philosopher
Alan White, British Committee of 100 (United Kingdom) signatory

See also
Allan White (1915–1993), English cricketer
Allan White (footballer) (1915–1987), Australian rules footballer
Al White (disambiguation)